Isdhoo or Isdū (according to the Admiralty charts) (Dhivehi: އިސްދޫ) is one of the inhabited islands of Haddhunmathi Atoll, administrative code Laamu part of Maldives in the Indian Ocean.

History
This island has important ruins from the historical Maldivian Buddhist era. These ruins include one of the largest stupas so far found in the Maldives.

Isdū Lōmāfānu
Lōmāfānu are ancient royal edicts written on copper plates. Lōmāfānu edicts were etched on long copper plates held together by a ring of the same metal. The lōmāfānu were written in the curly Evēla form of the Divehi akuru or old Maldive alphabet and they are very important documents in the History of the Maldives.
The oldest lōmāfānu that have hitherto been found and preserved are from Malé, the royal capital, and from the islands of Isdū and Dambidū in Haddhunmathi Atoll, where there were large Buddhist monasteries. These copperplates were issued at the end of the twelfth century AD.
These (lōmāfānu), make it clear that the general conversion from Buddhism to Islam was ordered by the king. Thanks to the lōmāfānu it is also known that the monasteries in Haddummati Atoll (Satu Duvu) were of great importance in the ancient Buddhist Kingdom of the Maldives.

According to the Isdū Lōmāfānu, monks from monasteries of the southern atoll of Haddhunmathi were brought to Malé and beheaded.

Geography

Demography

See also
 History of the Maldives

References

H.C.P. Bell, The Maldive Islands, An account of the physical features, History, Inhabitants, Productions and Trade. Colombo 1882, 
Xavier Romero-Frias, The Maldive Islanders, A Study of the Popular Culture of an Ancient Ocean Kingdom. Barcelona 1999,  

Islands of the Maldives